Funding4Learning is a "human capital oriented" crowd funding platform for educational projects. Funding4Learning provides its users with fundraising tools for study, volunteering, as well as a diverse array of education related initiatives.

Concept 

Funding4Learning, as other "crowdfunding dubbed" platforms, allows users to create a fundraising page for their funding initiative, offer "rewards" in accordance with different levels of contributions, and start a social media-based publicity and word of mouth effort.

Unlike similar sites such as Kickstarter or Indiegogo, Funding4Learning is a specialized crowdfunding site that dedicates entirely to education related projects.

Funding4Learning uses PayPal as their main provider for all the fundraising payment's processing and transaction services.

Model 
Funding4Learning works with an "all or nothing" approach, which means that the collected funds are disbursed only if the fundraising campaign is successful.  However, a contributor is allowed to make a "direct contribution", which is guaranteed to be paid whether or not the campaign is successful.  Funding4Learning charges 5% of funds disbursed from a successful campaign, and 5% of all direct contributions.

While there is no guarantee that users that post campaigns on Funding4Learning will undertake the educational program presented on their campaigns or deliver on their promise of a reward, Funding4Learning asks its users to post their resumes on their campaign website and advises donors to use their own judgment when supporting a campaign.

See also
 Comparison of crowd funding services

References

External links
 

Companies based in Barcelona
Defunct crowdfunding platforms
Internet properties established in 2011
Online financial services companies of Spain